Michael Siberry (born 1956) is an Australian stage and screen actor.

Life and career
Siberry was born in Hobart, Tasmania, Australia. He graduated from the National Institute of Dramatic Art in Sydney, Australia and began his career in Adelaide at the State Theatre Company of South Australia before moving to England to perform for the Royal Shakespeare Company. 

On Broadway, Siberry has performed the likes of Nicholas Nickleby in The Life and Adventures of Nicholas Nickleby, Gratiano in The Merchant of Venice, Captain Georg von Trapp in The Sound of Music and Shakespeare in The Frogs (Lincoln Center).

Other theatre credits include Morrell in Candida and Astrov in Uncle Vanya at the McCarter Theatre in Princeton, New Jersey and Osbourne in Journey's End, Oberon in A Midsummer Night’s Dream and Billy Flynn in Chicago at London's West end theatre. 

He portrayed King Arthur in the U.S. National Tour of Monty Python's Spamalot for two years before reprising it on Broadway in 2008. 

In 2017, he performed as Leo Tresler in the Tony-nominated Broadway drama Junk at the Lincoln Center.

His notable television appearances include Sherlock Holmes; Jeeves and Wooster; Highlander; The Grand; Silent Witness; Victoria & Albert; House of Cards; Boardwalk Empire; The Blacklist; Jessica Jones; Madam Secretary; The Last Tycoon and The Society. He had supporting roles in the films Boundaries of the Heart and Teen Agent.

Filmography

Film

Television

References

External links

1956 births
Living people
Australian male television actors
Australian male stage actors
Male actors from Hobart